Efstratios Pissas was a Greek revolutionary of the Greek War of Independence and an officer in the Greek Army.

Biography 
Pissas was born in the 1797 in Ayvalık on the western Anatolian coast to a wealthy family. He was initiated to Filiki Eteria by Veniamin Lesvios. After the beginning of the Greek War of Independence, he immediately joined the uprising and enlisted in the newly formed regular army.

Despite his youth, he was selected as leader of the rebels' army in Crete, and took part in many of battles that took place over the next seven years in Crete, Chios, Karystos, Chaidari, Tripoli, the capture of Palamidi and at the second siege of the Acropolis.

During the 3 September 1843 Revolution he was garrison commander of Athens. In 1864, he was sent by the Greek government to take over the newly annexed Ionian Islands from the British troops. He was repeatedly appointed as a chairman of the Revisionary Military Tribunal and retired in 1856 with the rank of lieutenant general.

He died on 1 January 1885.

Sources 
 Ευστράτιος Πίσσας συνοπτικό βιογραφικό σημείωμα από το Ινστιτούτο Νεοελληνικών Ερευνών
 

1797 births
1885 deaths
19th-century Greek military personnel
Greek military leaders of the Greek War of Independence
Hellenic Army lieutenant generals
People from Ayvalık
Members of the Filiki Eteria